Abiz-e Jadid (also Romanized as Ābīz-e Jadīd; also known as Ābīz) is a village in Shaskuh Rural District, Central District, Zirkuh County, South Khorasan Province, Iran. At the 2006 census, its population was 2,102, in 574 families.

References 

Populated places in Zirkuh County